Suzy Petty  (born 9 April 1992) is an English field hockey player who plays as a midfielder or defender for England and Great Britain.

She currently plays club hockey in the Investec Women's Hockey League Conference East for Wimbledon.

Petty has also played for Beeston.

References

1992 births
Living people
English female field hockey players
Commonwealth Games medallists in field hockey
Commonwealth Games bronze medallists for England
Female field hockey midfielders
Sportspeople from Leeds
Wimbledon Hockey Club players
Beeston Hockey Club players
Women's England Hockey League players
Field hockey players at the 2018 Commonwealth Games
Medallists at the 2018 Commonwealth Games